Dagg is a surname. Notable people with the surname include:

 Anne Innis Dagg (born 1933), Canadian zoologist, feminist and author
 Archie Dagg, traditional fiddler, piper and composer from Northumberland
 Israel Dagg (born 1988), New Zealand international rugby union player
 John L. Dagg (1794–1884), American Baptist minister and theologian
 Lyall Dagg, Canadian curler